Pokrovske is a village in Mykolaiv Raion (district) in Mykolaiv Oblast of southern Ukraine, at about  southwest by west (SWbW) of Mykolaiv.

It belongs to Ochakiv urban hromada, one of the hromadas of Ukraine.

During the Russian invasion of Ukraine, 2022
The settlement came under attack and was occupied by Russian forces during the Russian invasion of Ukraine in 2022. The settlement, as well as all other occupied territory in the Mykolaiv Oblast, was illegally annexed by Russia as part of their Kherson Oblast.

Following a Russian withdrawal and a counter offensive by Ukrainian forces between 9th and 11th November, almost all other settlements in the Mykolaiv Oblast were liberated from Russian control. The exceptions being Pokrovske as well as the other settlements on the Kinburn Peninsula, Vasylivka and Pokrovka.

References

Villages in Mykolaiv Raion, Mykolaiv Oblast